Mudarisovo (Möźäris) is a rural locality (a village) in Mikhaylovsky Selsoviet, Ufimsky District, Bashkortostan, Russia. The population was 198 as of 2010. There are 14 streets.

Geography 
Mudarisovo is located 19 km northwest of Ufa (the district's administrative centre) by road. Chernolesovsky is the nearest rural locality.

References 

Rural localities in Ufimsky District